Beringa Reserve, formerly known as Peniup Creek Reserve, is a 25.06 km2 nature reserve in south-west Western Australia.  It lies about 380 km south-east of Perth.  It is owned and managed by Bush Heritage Australia (BHA), by which it was purchased jointly with Greening Australia (WA) in 2007, and forms part of the Gondwana Link project, in which BHA is a partner.

Flora and fauna
The reserve protects yate, mallet and moort woodland as well as mallee heath vegetation and riparian communities along the upper Peniup Creek.  Much of the reserve was previously cleared and is now regenerating or planned to be revegetated.  Animals either recorded, or expected to be present, include black-gloved wallaby, tammar wallaby and red-tailed phascogale.

The nearby Peniup Nature Reserve is used for the DEC recovery program for the Dibbler (Parantechinus apicalis), an attempt to conserve this endangered species by its reintroduction.

References

External links
 Bush Heritage Australia
 Gondwana Link

Bush Heritage Australia reserves
Nature reserves in Western Australia
2007 establishments in Australia
Great Southern (Western Australia)